Marie Bouzková (born 21 July 1998) is a Czech professional tennis player. She attained her career-high WTA singles ranking of No. 24 on 12 December 2022. On 9 May 2022, she peaked at No. 24 in the WTA doubles rankings. So far, she has won one singles title (at the 2022 Prague Open) and three doubles titles on the WTA Tour. At the tournaments of the ITF Women's Circuit, Bouzková has won 12 singles titles and three doubles titles.

She won the 2014 US Open girls' singles title, defeating Anhelina Kalinina in the final. She made her WTA Tour debut at the 2015 Mexican Open, where she lost in the first round. Bouzková rose to prominence following her run to the semifinals at the 2019 Rogers Cup, where she defeated Sloane Stephens, Jeļena Ostapenko, and Simona Halep before falling to Serena Williams; despite losing, she pushed the former world No. 1 to three sets, winning the first set 6–1. She won her maiden WTA tournament title in doubles at the 2021 Birmingham Classic, partnering compatriot Lucie Hradecká.

Early life and background
Bouzková was born in Prague to father Milan and mother Květa, and has a younger brother, Benjamin Milan. She began playing tennis at a club owned by her parents in Prague. She moved to Florida at age 10 – initially trained at Bollietieri Academy for two years, then she continued to work with her dad and then Requeni from 2014. Marie admires the play of Serena Williams and Rafael Nadal. Besides Czech, she speaks English, Spanish and some German, and received her bachelor's degree in business administration with a minor in sports marketing and management through Indiana University East in 2022.

Career overview

2013–15: First singles & doubles ITF titles, WTA Tour debut
Bouzková started playing as a senior in April 2013. Her first tournament was the Katowice Open (WTA Tour tournament) where she played in qualifying as a wildcard player. In the first round she lost to Katarzyna Piter. Two months later, she made her debut at the ITF Women's Circuit at the $25k Zlín tournament. Her first ITF win came at the $10K Prague tournament in August where she defeated her compatriot Nikola Fraňková. 

In March 2014, she reached her first ITF semifinal at the $10k Gainesville event. As a result, she debut at the top 1000 a week later. For the second year in-a-row, she played as wildcard player at the Katowice Open in qualifying but still failed to make her WTA Tour main-draw debut. In early October, she won her first ITF title at the $10k Hilton Head tournament, after defeating Natalia Viklhyantseva, in straight sets. Soon after, she reached quarterfinal of the $50k Toronto tournament. This helped her made her top 500 debut right after.

Receiving a wildcard for the 2015 Mexican Open in Acapulco, Bouzková made her WTA Tour main-draw debut but lost to Sesil Karatantcheva in the first round. During April, she was not able to reached main-draw of the Katowice Open and Prague Open. In June, she won two back-to-back $10K Grand Baie La Croisette tournaments on the Mauritius. She followed up this with another ITF title, the $10K La Possession tournament on the Reunion Island (France). During August, she reached the $15K Horb tournament and $10K Portschach final. In the second half of September, she reached semifinal of the $25K Monterrey tournament as her last significant result of the year. In addition, this won her first doubles season. She played only one tournament, the $10K Grand Baie La Croisette tournament and won the title.

2016-18: Success on the ITF Circuit; Grand Slam debut

Despite making WTA Tour debut, in the following three years Bouzková had more impressive results on the ITF Circuit. She started season of 2016 with the final of the $10K tournament in Fort-de-France (Martinique). The following week, she traveled to Guadaloupe where she reached her first title of the year, at the $10k Petit Bourg tournament. During the second half of the February, she won title at the $25k Cuernavaca, and then lifted trophy in May at the $10k Monzon event. A month later, she won title at the $10K Puszczykowo after defeating Valeriya Savinykh in the final and not dropping a single set during the tournament. In September, she played in qualifying of the Tournoi de Québec as her first appearance at any WTA tournament in the season. After losing to Lauren Davis in first round of qualifying, she was forced to continue with ITF events. However, she did not reach any semifinal by the end of the year.   

During the January 2017, Bouzková had two early losses at the two $25k tournament in the United States. Her next destination was Australia. She started well with the semifinal of the $60K Burnie International. After early loss in the following week at the $60K Launceston International, she won title at the $25k Perth tournament defeating her compatriot Markéta Vondroušová. In early March, she lost in the qualifying of Mexican Open in Acapulco but then won title at the $15k Orlando event. A month later, she get to the main-draw of the Ladies Open Bien/Bielle through qualifying, as her first main-draw appearance since Mexican Open in February 2015. She lost in the first round to Barbora Strýcová. Still being in Switzerland, a week later Bouzkova reached semifinal of the $25k Chiasso tournament. In May, she get to the another ITF final, this time at the $25k Monzon tournament but lost to Georgina Garcia Perez. Some progress were seen from Bouzková, since she made her Grand Slam debut at the Wimbledon qualifying. After making her first win there, she was stopped in the second round of qualifying. At the US Open, she had another attempt to reach Grand Slam main-draw but lost in the first round of qualifying. In late September, she advanced to the final of the $25k Stillwater event but lost to Aleksandra Wozniak. She finished year with two early finishes at WTA Challengers in Asia, Hua Hin and Taipei. It was her WTA Challenger Tour debut.

Her 2018 season was marked with her Grand Slam debut in singles and return to play doubles events. Despite losing in the qualifying of first three majors, Bouzková won three matches in the qualifying of the US Open and it that way secured place in the main draw. She lost in her first main-draw match against Ana Bogdan. During the year, she was not so successful with reaching finals, getting to only one, at the $25k Iraputo tournament in February 2018. She won the title, after defeating Kristina Kucová in the final. However, this season was special for Bouzková since she made her doubles return after playing her last event in June 2015. Despite playing only five events, she reached one semifinal, at the $60k Granby Challenger in July 2018.

2019: Premier-5 semifinal, top 100, three top-10 wins
For Bouzková season started at the Brisbane International where she played in qualifying, in order to qualify for main-draw. She passed qualification, and in first round faced Samantha Stosur. Bouzková won, but was stopped in next round by Karolína Plíšková. At the Australian Open, she failed to qualify, losing in first round of qualification to compatriot Barbora Krejčíková. On both Indian Wells Open and Miami Open, she failed to qualify. At the clay-court season, she reached first round of Prague Open, and passed qualifying at the French Open, where she lost in first round to Bianca Andreescu. At Wimbledon, she also entered through qualifying. In the first round of the main draw, she beat Mona Barthel, but lost to Maria Sakkari in the second. 

During the US Open Series, she played at the Stanford Classic, where she failed in the first round. The following week at the Canadian Open, she had her first appearance at the qualifying of some Premier-5 tournament, and she accomplished her career-best result so far. On the way to the semifinals, she defeated Leylah Fernandez, former US Open champion Sloane Stephens, former French Open champion Jeļena Ostapenko, and two-time Grand Slam champion Simona Halep, with Stephens and Halep being her first two top-ten wins. Bouzková faced Serena Williams in the semifinals. Bouzková won the first set but then Serena made a turnover and eventually won the match. At the US Open, Bouzková made her first appearance in the main draw of a Grand Slam tournament, without need for playing in qualifying; however, she lost to Ajla Tomljanović. On the Asian swing, she reached the quarterfinals at the Guangzhou Open, also scoring a third top-ten win over Elina Svitolina, and the second round at the Wuhan Open, but failed to qualify for the China Open.

In July, she reached the top 100, and she finished the year as No. 57.

2020: First WTA tournament singles final, top 50 in singles

Bouzková didn't have much success at her first tournaments. At the Brisbane International, she failed in the first round, losing to Madison Keys. The following week at the Hobart International, she also lost in the first round. She played at the Australian Open for the first time in the main draw, but was stopped in the first round by defending champion Naomi Osaka. At the Mexican Open, she still didn't make her first win in 2020, but the following week, at the Monterrey Open, it finally happened, when she reached her first WTA tournament final. She lost the final to Elina Svitolina in a tough three-set match. After her good performance in Monterrey, she entered the top 50 on 9 March at No. 47.

After the COVID-19 pandemic outbreak, she had success on her first tournament when she reached the quarterfinals, but lost to the eventual champion, Jennifer Brady. She also had success at the Cincinnati Open by reaching the third round, where she lost to Anett Kontaveit. At the US Open, she lost in the first round to Jessica Pegula. During the clay-court season, she played at the Italian Open, making her debut at that tournament. She was stopped in the second round by Elena Rybakina. On 31 August, she reached a new career-high in singles at No. 46.

2021: Doubles raising: two major quarterfinals & maiden WTA Tour title & top 35
In June, she won her maiden WTA tournament title in doubles at the Birmingham Classic, partnering compatriot Lucie Hradecká, where they defeated the pair of Ons Jabeur and Ellen Perez in a tight three-set match. She lifted her second trophy also with Hradecká at the Prague Open.

2022: Wimbledon quarterfinal, first WTA title and top 30 in singles
She recorded her first major win at the Australian Open over qualifier Rebecca Marino.
At the Indian Wells Open, she reached the third round at this tournament for the first time in her career. She repeated the feat reaching also the third round at a WTA 1000 level at the Madrid Open.
At the French Open, she reached the second round in singles for the first time in her career but had to withdraw from her singles match with Elise Mertens and her doubles match due to COVID-19.

At Wimbledon, she defeated Caroline Garcia to reach her first Grand Slam quarterfinal in her career.

At the Prague Open, Bouzková defeated Anastasia Potapova to win her first WTA tournament in her career. As a result she moved back into the top 50 in the rankings at world No. 46 on 1 August 2022.

At the WTA 1000 Cincinnati Open, she reached the second round after the 11th seed Coco Gauff retired. In doubles, she reached the round of 16 with Laura Siegemund. And as a result, she reached a new career-high of No. 41 in the singles, and returned back to the top 40 in the doubles rankings.

At the WTA 1000 Guadalajara Open, she reached the quarterfinals only for the second time at this level, defeating Liudmila Samsonova. She then reached the semifinals, after Anna Kalinskaya was forced to retire from their match. As a result, she moved to a new career-high into the top 30 in the singles rankings. She then lost her semifinal match to Maria Sakkari in two sets; play was delayed by rain after the first set and had to be continued the following day.

Performance timelines

Only main-draw results in WTA Tour, Grand Slam tournaments, Fed Cup/Billie Jean King Cup and Olympic Games are included in win–loss records.

Singles
Current after the 2023 Indian Wells Open.

Doubles
Current after the 2023 Dubai Open.

Mixed doubles

WTA career finals

Singles: 4 (1 title, 3 runner-ups)

Doubles: 5 (3 titles, 2 runner-ups)

WTA Challenger finals

Singles: 1 (runner-up)

ITF Circuit finals

Singles: 16 (12 titles, 4 runner–ups)

Doubles: 3 (3 titles)

Junior finals

Junior Grand Slam finals

Girls' singles: 1 (title)

Girls' doubles: 1 (runner–up)

ITF Finals

Singles: 11 (7 titles, 4 runner-ups)

Doubles: 6 (1 title, 5 runner-ups)

WTA Tour career earnings
Current after the 2023 Qatar Open.

Record against other players

Record against top 10 players

 She has a 6–11 record against players who were, at the time the match was played, ranked in the top 10.

Notes

References

External links
 
 
 

1998 births
Living people
Czech female tennis players
US Open (tennis) junior champions
Tennis players from Prague
Sportspeople from Bradenton, Florida
Grand Slam (tennis) champions in girls' singles
21st-century Czech women